Sholay Aur Toofan is a 1994 Hindi action film of Bollywood directed by N. Paryani and produced by Mohan T. Gehani. This film was released on 4 March 1994 under the banner of Devi Films. Anand–Milind were the music directors of the film.

Plot
This is a revenge story of a girl named Radha. Radha, Sita and Geeta are three sisters who live in a village with their mother. Sita is envious of her sisters and joins a bad gang, whereas Geeta becomes a police officer. Radha is gang-raped by four goons who are powerful and have connections  with the head of police. Radha kills Pandit, one of the rapists, and her sister Geeta comes to arrest Radha, but she escapes from the police with the help of one Khan Baba. She meets some girls in the jungle who have also been victimised by those goons. Radha leads them and they take up arms to take revenge their enemies.

Cast
 Shakti Kapoor as Police Constable
 Rakesh Bedi as Pandit
 Kiran Kumar as Khan Baba
 Goga Kapoor as Police officer
 Bharat Kapoor
 Sripradha as Radha
 Ajit Vachani
 Raaj Premi
 Damini

Soundtrack
"Babu Na Kare Ishare" - Kavita Krishnamurthy
"Lootere Sun To Papi Hai" - Kavita Krishnamurthy
"Ramzan Ka Mahina" - Mohammed Aziz
"Sipaiya Ko Main Apna" - Dilraj Kaur
"Sun Le O Meri Radha" - Mohammed Aziz and Kavita Krishnamurthy

References

Indian action films
1994 films
1994 action films
1990s Hindi-language films
Films scored by Anand–Milind
Indian films about revenge
Hindi-language action films